Orta di Atella is a comune (municipality) in the Province of Caserta in the Italian region Campania, located about  north of Naples and about  southwest of Caserta.

Orta di Atella borders the following municipalities: Caivano, Crispano, Frattaminore, Marcianise, Sant'Arpino and Succivo.

References 

Cities and towns in Campania